Stefanie Frohberg (born 20 June 1991, in Berlin) is a German former competitive ice dancer. With Tim Giesen, she placed 11th at the 2010 World Junior Championships and competed at two Grand Prix events.

Career 
Frohberg began learning to skate in 1996. Competing in ladies' singles, she won Jugend group B at the 2007 German Youth Championships.

Frohberg switched to ice dancing at 17. After an initial partnership with William Beier, she teamed up with Tim Giesen in April 2009. They decided to train in Berlin, coached by René Lohse. Competing in the 2009–10 ISU Junior Grand Prix series, Frohberg/Giesen placed fourth in Lake Placid, New York, and then fifth in Dresden, Germany. After winning the national junior title, they were sent to the 2010 World Junior Championships in The Hague, Netherlands. They finished 11th after placing 9th in the compulsory dance, 15th in the original dance, and 11th in the free dance.

Frohberg/Giesen competed in the senior ranks in their second and final season together. They received two Grand Prix assignments; they placed eight at the 2010 Skate Canada International and then ninth at the 2010 Skate America. At the 2011 German Championships, they finished second, 27.41 points behind the champions, Nelli Zhiganshina / Alexander Gazsi. At the end of the season, Frohberg retired from competitive skating in order to focus on her studies.

Programs 
(with Giesen)

Competitive highlights

Ice dancing with Giesen

Ladies' singles

References

External links

 

1991 births
Living people
German female ice dancers
Figure skaters from Berlin